Cordonazo winds or the Lash of St. Francis, refers to southerly hurricane winds along the intertropical region (Ecuador, Colombia, Mexico, Panama and Venezuela). In Mexico is associated with tropical cyclones in the southeastern North Pacific Ocean. These storms may occur from May to November, but ordinarily affect the coastal areas most severely near or after the Feast of St. Francis, on October 4.

Sources

Portions of this article originated from the glossary of Bowditch's American Practical Navigator, a document produced by the government of the United States of America.

References

Winds
Climate of Mexico

pl:Wiatr#Lokalne wiatry nazwane